Use may refer to:

 Use (law), an obligation on a person to whom property has been conveyed
 Use (liturgy), a special form of Roman Catholic ritual adopted for use in a particular diocese
 Use–mention distinction, the distinction between using a word and mentioning it
 Consumption (economics)
 Resource depletion, use to the point of lack of supply
 Psychological manipulation, in a form that treats a person is as a means to an end
 Rental utilization, quantification of the use of assets to be continuously let

See also 
 Use case
 User story
 USE (disambiguation)
 Used (disambiguation)
 User (disambiguation)